The 1915 Dayton Gym-Cadets season was their third season in the Ohio League. The team changed its name this season from the St. Mary's Cadets to the Dayton Gym-Cadets, after their presumed sponsors, the Dayton Gymnastic Club. The team posted a 7–1–1 record.

Schedule

Game notes

References
Pro Football Archives: Dayton Gym-Cadets 1915

Dayton Triangles seasons
Dayton Tri
Dayton Tri